Megachile seducta is a species of bee in the family Megachilidae. It was described by Mitchell in 1934.

References

Seducta
Insects described in 1934